De moribus tartarorum (On the Custom of Tatars) may refer to one of the following treatises:

De moribus tartarorum, lituanorum et moscorum by Michalon Lituanus
De moribus tartarorum. Itinerarium orientis by William of Rubruck